The women's 500 metres races of the 2013–14 ISU Speed Skating World Cup 5, arranged in Eisstadion Inzell, in Inzell, Germany, was held on 7 and 8 March 2014.

Heather Richardson of the United States won race one, while Judith Hesse of Germany came second, and Olga Fatkulina of Russia came third.

Race two was also won by Richardson, while Fatkulina improved to second place, and Jenny Wolf of Germany placed third.

Race 1
Race one took place on Friday, 7 March, scheduled in the afternoon session, at 15:00. Due to the limited number of competitors, there was no Division B.

Division A

Race 2
Race two took place on Saturday, 8 March, scheduled in the afternoon session, at 13:30. Due to the limited number of competitors, there was no Division B.

Division A

References

Women 0500
5